State Route 54 (SR 54) is a west–east rural highway in West Tennessee, which runs from Covington to just north of Paris.

Route description

Covington to Alamo
SR 54 begins in downtown Covington in Tipton County at an intersection with US 51/SR 3. It then goes to a junction with SR 384. Shortly afterwards, it has a junction with SR 179. SR 54 then exits Covington and continues to the east, passing through Glenn and having an intersection with SR 14, which is its northern terminus. SR 54 then continues east and crosses into Haywood County. It then enters Brownsville and intersects SR 19, just a short distance away from its junction with US 70. It continues into town and has a junction with SR 1 (Old US 70) and begins a short concurrency together, and comes to a junction in the center of town with SR 76 and SR 369 and turns north to become concurrent with them, separating from SR 1. Just outside of town, SR 54 separates from SR 76/SR 369 and continues north. It then goes through Belle Eagle and crosses into Crockett County. It then comes to a junction with SR 88 and turns east to become concurrent with it and intersects with SR 188 almost immediately. It then comes to an interchange with US 412/SR 20 before entering Alamo. In the center of downtown, SR 54/SR 88 has an intersection with SR 221 and turns north, separating from SR 88. SR 54 continues north and has a junction SR 152 before entering Gibson County.

Gibson County
After entering Gibson County, SR 54 then goes through Frog Jump and intersects SR 457 before entering Trenton. There, SR 54 has a junction with SR 367. It continues and has a junction with US 45W/SR 5, turning north to run concurrently with it, and has a junction with SR 186. They continue north and have an intersection with SR 77/SR 104. US 45W and SR 54 separate, with SR 54 turning northeast and exiting Trenton. It then intersects SR 185. It then enters Bradford and comes to an intersection with US 45E/SR 43, turns north, and runs concurrently with it, bypassing Bradford to the east. It then comes to a junction with SR 105 (Old US 45E), and exits Bradford.

Weakley and Henry Counties
SR 54 then enters Weakley County and enters Greenfield. in downtown, it intersects with SR 124. SR 54 then separates from US 45E and turns east, and exits Greenfield. It then curves to the northeast, then north, and enters Dresden, immediately having an intersection with SR 22. A Short distance away, it has a junction with SR 89/SR 239, with SR 239 ending and SR 89 running concurrently with SR 54. They continue into downtown, then turn east, and intersect SR 118. They continue east together before separating and SR 54 continues east alone, having an intersection and short concurrency with SR 217 shortly afterwards. Further east it has an intersection and short concurrency with SR 190, and continuing east. SR 54 then crosses into Henry County, enters Como, and intersects with SR 140. It then continues east and has a junction with SR 218 before entering Paris. In Paris, it becomes concurrent with SR 69, and continues into downtown, where it comes to an intersection with US 641 and SR 356, with SR 69 turning south on US 641, SR 356 continuing straight, and SR 54 becomes the unsigned companion of US 641. They run north together to Puryear, where there is another intersection with SR 140. They continue north to the Kentucky state line just south of Hazel, KY, where US 641 crosses into Kentucky while SR 54 ends there.

The route's concurrencies include: 
 from Brims Corner to Alamo,
 through the city of Trenton,
 from Bradford to Greenfield,
 through the city of Dresden, and
 (hidden designation) from Paris to the Kentucky state line.

Major intersections

References 

054
054
054
054
054
054
054